Applus+ IDIADA is an engineering company providing design, testing, engineering and homologation services to the automotive industry.
The main office, located near Barcelona, Spain, comprises a 360-hectare proving ground and test facility complex. The company is independent of any vehicle manufacturer, and has an international network of subsidiaries and branch offices in 25 countries, including Brazil, China and India.

History
The company was first established in 1971 as IDIADA, standing for the Catalan initials of Institut d'Investigació Aplicada de l'Automòbil (Institute for Applied Automotive Research) at the Polytechnic University of Catalonia. In 1990, IDIADA was separated from the university and established as an independent company owned by the Government of Catalonia. IDIADA A.T. (80% owned by Applus+ and 20% by the Government of Catalonia) has been operating under an exclusive contract from the 351-hectare technology centre near Barcelona (owned by the Government of Catalonia) since 1999. The contract to operate the business runs until September 2024 and although it is renewable in five year periods until 2049, the current expectation is that there will be no further extensions but a tender for a new 20-year concession. Since 1997, IDIADA has opened multiple offices globally.

In 2016 Applus+ IDIADA started managing a new proving ground in China, and in 2018 Applus+ acquired, a vehicle passive safety testing and engineering company in the United States.

Products, services and innovation
The main services offered by Applus+ IDIADA are as follows:

 Engineering services: design, engineering and validation capabilities for vehicle development projects .
 Proving grounds: IDIADA offers proving grounds in Europe and Asia. The proving grounds, located in Spain and China, offer customer support combined with test tracks and workshops. In 2016 Applus+ IDIADA started managing the new proving ground complex in China, open to all companies in the automotive sector.
 Homologation services: in accordance with all European EC, and ECE Regulations IDIADA is also accredited for Australia, Europe, Japan, Taiwan and Malaysia as well as giving consultancy to other countries and regions such as South America (including Brazil), China, Middle East, Gulf Countries, ASEAN, USA, Canada, among others.

Applus+ IDIADA has also carried out a number of innovation projects. Some of the most important are:

 In 2002, Applus+ IDIADA began the process of developing hybrid and electric vehicles with a focus on passive safety and durability. Applus+ IDIADA has developed an end-to-end service for the manufacture of hybrids and fully electric vehicles, able to fulfil all functions for all vehicle types. In recent years the strategic innovation plan has been focused towards connected and automated vehicles.
 At the 2012 FISITA Congress in Beijing, IDIADA presented the iShare, a concept electric quadricycle designed specifically for carsharing.
 In 2013, IDIADA launched an electric sports car called the Volar-e, developed in cooperation with the Croatian company Rimac Automobili. 
 In 2015 a new project called PROSPECT was undertaken. The project aims to improve the effectiveness of active VRU safety systems compared to current systems by expanding the scope of accident scenarios addressed and improving the overall system performance.
 Also in 2015, Applus+ IDIADA started the Catalonia Living Lab, a public-private framework for developing and testing connected and automated vehicle (CAV) technologies. Its primary goal is to cover all CAV-related development and testing needs. It provides the main test environments required in the connected and automated vehicle development process: from virtual simulation to laboratories, proving grounds and public roads. Between all partners involved, it covers the complete development cycle of automated and connected vehicle functionalities: from concept finding and design to integration and final validation.
 In 2017 Applus+ IDIADA, together with other companies, began to develop the C-MobILE (Accelerating C-ITS Mobility Innovation and depLoyment in Europe) project, which envisions a safer, more efficient, more sustainable and economically viable European road network without casualties and serious injuries, in particular in complex urban areas and for vulnerable road users. C-MobILE will set the basis for large-scale deployment in Europe, elevating research pilot sites to deployment locations of sustainable services that are supported by local authorities, using a common approach that ensures interoperability and seamless availability of services towards acceptable end user cost and positive business case for parties in the supply chain.
 In 2017 and 2018, Applus+ IDIADA participated in the Mobile World Congress jointly with Ericsson and Telefonica. In 2017 they showcased 5G technology driving a vehicle remotely from Barcelona to 70 km away. 
 In 2018 Applus+ IDIADA participated for the first time at the Geneva Motor Show presenting the CRONUZ.

References

External link 

 

Engineering companies of Spain
Companies based in Catalonia
Technology companies established in 1990
Road test tracks
Automotive companies of Spain
Spanish brands
Spanish companies established in 1990